The 2011–12 Plunket Shield season was the 86th season of official first class domestic cricket in New Zealand. The season started on 7 November 2011.

The Plunket Shield and other domestic cricket in New Zealand has traditionally been broadcast ball-by-ball by Radio New Zealand (RNZ) and more recently by Radio Sport after parts of RNZ were privatised in the 1990s. This season marked a historic milestone when Radio Sport decided to not provide any live commentary of the Plunket Shield, . This was unexpected by both listeners and the administrators of six major associations.

The competition was won by Northern Districts, who claimed the title for the eighth time after securing enough bonus points in their final match despite losing heavily to Central Districts by 252 runs.

Table

The winner will be decided on points at the end of the 10 rounds.

Teams

† Most teams play matches at other venues throughout the season.

See also

Plunket Shield
New Zealand limited-overs cricket trophy
HRV Twenty20 Cup
2011–12 Ford Trophy
2011–12 HRV Cup

References

Plunket Shield
Plunket Shield
1